This is a list of cities in Azerbaijan. Azerbaijan is a country in the South Caucasus region, situated at the crossroads of Southwest Asia and Southeastern Europe. As of 2013, Azerbaijan has 78 cities, including 10 cities of republican subordination, 67 district-level cities, and 1 special legal status city. These are followed by 260 urban-type settlements and 4,252 villages.

Cities in Azerbaijan 

There are 78 urban settlements in Azerbaijan with the official status of a city:

 Aghdam
 Agdash
 Aghjabadi
 Agstafa
 Agsu
 Astara
 Aghdara
 Babek
 Baku – the capital and largest city of Azerbaijan
 Balakən
 Barda
 Beylagan
 Bilasuvar
 Dashkasan
 Shabran
 Fuzuli
 Gadabay
 Ganja
 Goranboy
 Goychay
 Goygol
 Hajigabul
 Imishli
 Ismayilli
 Jabrayil
 Julfa
 Kalbajar
 Khachmaz
 Khankendi
 Khojavend
 Khirdalan
 Kurdamir
 Lankaran
 Lerik
 Masally
 Mingachevir
 Nakhchivan
 Naftalan
 Neftchala
 Oghuz
 Ordubad
 Qabala
 Qakh
 Qazakh
 Quba
 Qubadli
 Qusar
 Saatlı (city)
 Sabirabad
 Shahbuz
 Shaki
 Shamakhi
 Shamkir
 Sharur
 Shirvan
 Siyazan
 Shusha
 Sumgait
 Tartar
 Tovuz
 Ujar
 Yardimli
 Yevlakh
 Zaqatala
 Zardab
 Zangilan

Most populous Azerbaijani cities 
List of ten cities, including the capital Baku, with the largest urban population in 2018.

See also 

 Administrative divisions of Azerbaijan
 List of geographic names of Iranian origin
 List of cities by country
 List of cities in Asia
 List of cities in Europe

References 

 
Azerbaijan, List of cities in
Cities in Azerbaijan
Azerbaijan